Hooper Bay Airport  is a state-owned public-use airport two miles (3 km) southwest of Hooper Bay, Alaska, United States.

Facilities 
It has one runway (13/31) with an asphalt and gravel surface measuring 3,300 x 75 ft (1,006 x 23 m).

Airlines and destinations 

Prior to its bankruptcy and cessation of all operations, Ravn Alaska served the airport from multiple locations.

Top destinations

References

External links 
 FAA Alaska airport diagram (GIF)

Airports in the Kusilvak Census Area, Alaska